Overhand may refer to:

 Overhand (boxing), a looping punch
 Overhand knot
 Overhand throwing motion
 Overhand grip